RS1 or RS-1 may refer to:
 ALCO RS-1, a 4-axle diesel-electric locomotive built by Alco-GE and later by Alco alone
 K-5 (missile), also known as RS-1U or product ShM, an early Soviet air-to-air missile
 The Reid and Sigrist R.S.1, a British twin-engined, three-seat advanced trainer developed during World War II
 Retinoschisin, a protein that in humans is encoded by the RS1 gene
 Ross RS-1 Zanonia, a single seat, gull-winged glider
 RS-1, an Indian satellite in the Rohini (satellite) series
 (7080) 1986 RS1, generally written as (7080) 1986 RS1, a main-belt minor planet
 Sikorsky S-41, an amphibious flying boat airliner designated by the U.S. Navy as RS-1
 Stadler Regio-Shuttle RS1, a diesel railcar manufactured by Stadler Rail AG
 Goodyear RS-1 America's first semi-rigid airship
 RS/1, statistical software from Bolt, Beranek and Newman
 The first Randall–Sundrum model
 ABL Space Systems RS1, a planned liquid-fuelled small-lift launch vehicle